Megachile callura is a species of bee in the family Megachilidae. It was described by Theodore Dru Alison Cockerell in 1914.

References

Callura
Insects described in 1914